Nicholas de Mellipont was Archdeacon of Armagh in 1300:

Notes

13th-century Irish Roman Catholic priests
Archdeacons of Armagh